Run the Jewels, also known by the initials RTJ, is an American hip hop super-duo composed of Brooklyn-based rapper and producer El-P and Atlanta-based rapper Killer Mike. They released their critically acclaimed self-titled debut studio album as a free download in 2013 and have since released the follow-up albums Run the Jewels 2 (2014), Run the Jewels 3 (2016), and RTJ4 (2020), all of which have been released for free and received critical acclaim.

History

Formation and Run the Jewels (2011–2013)

El-P was active professionally in music from the early 1990s, first with Company Flow and then as a solo artist and in-demand producer for others. Killer Mike's recording debut was in 2000 with Outkast on the Stankonia album, and his solo debut appeared in 2003. 

The duo were first introduced to each other by Cartoon Network executive Jason DeMarco in 2011. El-P later produced Mike's 2012 album R.A.P. Music, which was soon followed by Mike's appearance on the track "Tougher Colder Killer" from El-P's 2012 album Cancer 4 Cure. When R.A.P. Music and Cancer 4 Cure were released within weeks of each other, the two decided to tour together. The success of the tour eventually led to the decision to form Run the Jewels, with the duo taking their name from a lyric in the 1990 LL Cool J song "Cheesy Rat Blues".

On June 26, 2013, Run the Jewels released their self-titled debut album on Fool's Gold Records as a free download. They also released "36" Chain" as a free track as part of the 2013 edition of the yearly Adult Swim Singles Program.

Run the Jewels 2 (2014–2015)

Run the Jewels 2 was released through Mass Appeal Records on October 24, 2014. A light-hearted remix album composed entirely of cat sounds titled Meow the Jewels was released on September 25, 2015. It features guest production from the likes of Prince Paul, Boots, Geoff Barrow, Zola Jesus, The Alchemist, Just Blaze and others. Proceeds from the album went entirely to charity. They also announced the release of a traditional remix album of Run the Jewels 2 which was to be released via Fool's Gold Records in 2015. Like the previous year, Adult Swim released the 2014 edition of their compilation, which saw the release of the lead single from Run the Jewels 2, "Oh My Darling (Don't Cry)", while the non-album single "Rubble Kings (Dynamite on the Street)" was released in 2015.

Run the Jewels supported Jack White at Madison Square Garden on January 30, 2015. In early 2015, it was announced that the band would perform at the Coachella Valley Music and Arts Festival in April and the Bonnaroo Music and Arts Festival in June. In addition to these larger festivals, RTJ also announced performances at the Boston Calling Music Festival, the Big Guava Music Festival, the Pitchfork Music Festival, the Austin City Limits Music Festival, and the Music Midtown Festival in Atlanta, Georgia; Blink-182 drummer Travis Barker was slated to join them. Trackstar the DJ served as Run the Jewels' DJ during their RTJ2 tour.

Killer Mike revealed that the duo would begin work on Run the Jewels 3 in January 2015. Run the Jewels released an exclusive 12-inch on April 18, 2015 in conjunction with Record Store Day. The record included a new track ("Bust No Moves" feat. SL Jones) in addition to three previously-released songs.

The single "Lie, Cheat, Steal", released in 2015, was later used as the theme song to the Netflix documentary series Dirty Money.

Run the Jewels 3 (2016–2018)

In 2016, Adult Swim was once again used to release "Talk to Me" from Run the Jewels 3. Run the Jewels then released the song "Love Again" featuring Gangsta Boo. "Love Again" went on to win Run the Jewels the UK Music Video Awards for "Best Urban Video" and "Best Editing in a Video".

February 6, 2016, the duo performed three songs ("Talk to Me", "Legend Has It", "A Report to the Shareholders") for NPR's Music Tiny Desk Concert.

 
August 24, 2016, DJ Shadow's single "Nobody Speak (feat. Run The Jewels)" was released, featuring a music video of brawling politicians just before the 2016 election. This song has been featured in several TV shows and movies. The song was produced by the Mass Appeal record label and DJ Shadow, which he calls the standout track on his album The Mountain Will Fall. The duo were extras in the video. The video was directed by Sam Pilling. produced by Pulse Films, and starred Igor Tsyshkevych and Ian Bailey. It was shot in NYC, London and Ukraine.

Run the Jewels 3 was digitally released on December 24, 2016, three weeks prior to its previously announced release date of January 13, 2017. Physical release of the album appeared on January 13 in the United States and January 20 elsewhere.  In the same month, Adult Swim's late-night anime block Toonami promoted the album by replacing regular music with tracks from the album.

In June 2017, the track "Legend Has It" from Run the Jewels 3 was featured in the teaser trailer for Marvel's Black Panther during game four of the 2017 NBA Finals, and was viewed 89 million times in 24 hours. Multiple Run the Jewels tracks were also featured in the 2017 action film Baby Driver, which also featured a cameo by Killer Mike. In September 2017, Run the Jewels released "Mean Demeanor", a track created for the soccer video game FIFA 18.

In March 2018, Adult Swim released a Run the Jewels/Rick and Morty crossover music video for "Oh Mama". The music was a remix of "Oh Mama" from Run the Jewels 3 accompanied by sound effects from a Rick and Morty short. The effort was directed by Juan Meza-León, and was released prior to Run the Jewels headlining the 2018 Adult Swim Festival on October 7, 2018.

On December 12, 2019, the single "Legend Has It" was certified gold by the Recording Industry Association of America.

RTJ4 (2018–2022)

On October 11, 2018, Run the Jewels released a new song titled "Let's Go (The Royal We)", which was featured in that year's superhero film Venom and debuted on Zane Lowe's Apple Music's Beats 1 show. It was also confirmed that their fourth album was in the works.

On March 22, 2020, Run the Jewels released "Yankee and the Brave (ep.4)" as the first single from RTJ4. Four days later, they released the second single, "Ooh LA LA" (featuring Greg Nice and DJ Premier). The album was released digitally on June 3, 2020, two days earlier than their announced released date of June 5, with a physical release in September 2020. It was their first album to be officially titled under its abbreviated name as opposed to the formatting of previous albums, which would have rendered the title Run the Jewels 4. On June 6, as they had done with the preceding album, Toonami once again promoted the album by replacing regular music in their promos with music from the album. In July, the duo announced the release of their own cannabis strain with a "sweet fruit cake [taste] with a herbal tea finish", named after their single "Ooh LA LA".

In an attempt to increase voter turnout for the 2020 elections, Run the Jewels performed RTJ4 in its entirety from a warehouse during a YouTube stream titled Holy Calamavote (a reference to their song "Holy Calamafuck") on October 18. Hosted by Eric Andre in the style of a parody telethon and sponsored by Adult Swim and Ben & Jerry's, the performance featured appearances from all of the collaborators on the album, with some appearing in person while others appeared via pre-recorded performances played on large screens in the background.

Alongside several other artists, Run the Jewels provided music for the video game Cyberpunk 2077, released in December 2020. One month before the game's release, they released a song they wrote for the game called "No Save Point", accompanied by a music video which shows them performing the song within the game's world. They were credited as Yankee and the Brave for this song. Around the same time, the video game Spider-Man: Miles Morales was released, which features an instrumental version of "The Ground Below" from RTJ4 in the background during a mission. The duo composed the opening theme for the direct-to-video Adult Swim film, Aqua Teen Forever: Plantasm, which released on November 8, 2022.

The official release for RTJ4 was June 5, 2020. The duo announced on June 3 that they were also giving out the album for free and that it is streamable.

On October 21, 2022, the group announced a remix album of RTJ4 titled, RTJ Cu4tro. It featured remixes from Latin artists and was released on November 11.

Tributes
As part of the promotion for Run the Jewels 2, the duo started a "Tag the Jewels" movement encouraging graffiti artists from around the world to tag their rendition of the duo's signature "pistol and fist" hand gesture, as featured on all of their album covers. 30 artists were invited to participate in the movement, creating large murals on six continents. The same "pistol and fist" gesture was featured on the covers of several Marvel comic books since 2015. Marvel editor-in-chief Axel Alonso was the driving force behind the gesture's incorporation into variant covers for Deadpool #45, Howard the Duck #2, Deadpool's Secret Secret Wars #1, Black Panther #2, Cage #1 and Doctor Strange/Punisher: Magic Bullets #1 variant. In the video game Borderlands 3, one of playable character FL4K's pets will throw up the duo's "pistol and fist" gesture when interacted with. In the video game Gears of War 4, a promotional skin bundle featuring Run the Jewels as playable characters was released in early 2017. For the video game Cyberpunk 2077, a photo mode pose option is the duo's signature "pistol and fist" gesture.

Members
 Jaime "El-P" Meline – vocals, production
 Michael "Killer Mike" Render – vocals

Touring members
 Gabe "Trackstar the DJ" Moskoff – turntables, samples, backing vocals

Discography

Studio albums
Run the Jewels (2013)
Run the Jewels 2 (2014)
Run the Jewels 3 (2016)
RTJ4 (2020)

Tours 
Headlining
 Run the Jewels Tour (2015)
 Run the World Tour (2017)

Supporting
 Lorde – Melodrama World Tour (2018)
 Rage Against the Machine  – Public Service Announcement Tour (2022)
2020 was postponed in part due to the COVID-19 pandemic.
It was set to resume 2021 but April 8, 2021, it was announced the tour will be delayed until March 31, 2022, starting in El Paso, Texas, USA.
The RATM 2022 tour poster on both bands' sites, shows one date JUL-16**RTJ not playing at QUEBEC CITY, QC, FESTIVAL D'ETE DE QUEBEC
The end of the US tour is set to end in a 5-day final in New York City, NY, USA, at the Madison Square Garden, August 08th - 14

Awards and nominations

Grammy Awards 
The Grammy Awards is an annual awards ceremony presented by The Recording Academy. Run The Jewels has been nominated for one award.

!
|-
!scope="row" | 2018
|"Chase Me" (Danger Mouse Featuring Run The Jewels & Big Boi)
|Best Rap Song
|
|  style="text-align:center;" |
|}

UK Music Video Awards 
The UK Music Video Awards is an annual celebration of creativity, technical excellence and innovation in music video and moving image for music. Run The Jewels have won two awards from six nominations.

!
|-
| 2014
| A Christmas F*cking Miracle
| Best Urban Video – Budget
| 
|style="text-align:center;" rowspan=6|
|-
| rowspan="3"| 2015
| Close Your Eyes (And Count to Fuck) (feat Zack de la Rocha)
| Best Urban Video-International
| 
|-
| Lie, Cheat, Steal
| Best Urban Video – Budget
| 
|-
| Early
| Best Lyric Video
| 
|-
| rowspan="2"| 2016
| rowspan=2| Love Again  (with Gangsta Boo)
| Best Urban Video-International
| 
|-
| Best Editing in a Video
| 
|}

NME Awards 
The NME Awards is an annual music awards show in the United Kingdom, founded by the music magazine, NME (New Musical Express) . Run The Jewels have received three nominations (Best Album in 2015, and Best Festival Band and Best International Band in 2016) and won two awards (Best Festival Band and Best International Band in 2016).
	 
	
!
|-
| 2016 	
| Run The Jewels 	
| Best International Band
| 	
|style="text-align:center;" |
|}

A2IM Libera Awards 
The A2IM Libera Awards is an annual music awards show created by the American Association of Independent Music. Run The Jewels have won five awards from eleven nominations.

!
|-
| rowspan="4"|2015
| Meow the Jewels / Tag the Jewels
| Marketing Genius Award
| 	
|style="text-align:center;" rowspan=11|
|-
| Run The Jewels
| Hardest Working Artist of the Year
| 	
|-
| rowspan="2"|Run the Jewels 2
| Groundbreaking Album of the Year
| 	
|-
|Album of the Year
| 	
|-
| rowspan="4"|2016
| Run The Jewels
| Best Live Act
| 	
|-
| Meow The Jewels
| Creative Packaging
| 	
|-
| #12DaysofRTJ
| Marketing Genius Award 
| 	
|-
| Close Your Eyes (and Count to F*ck) 
| Video of the Year
| 	
|-
| rowspan="3"| 2017
| rowspan="2"|Run the Jewels 3
| Album of the Year
| 	
|-
| Best Rap/Hip-Hop Album
| 
|-
| Run The Jewels
| Best Live Act
| 	
|}

Notes

References

External links
 
 
 
 

2013 establishments in the United States
American hip hop groups
American musical duos
Big Dada artists
Hip hop duos
Hip hop supergroups
Musical groups established in 2013
Ninja Tune artists
NME Awards winners